The Episcopal Church of the Resurrection is located on Gregory Lane in Pleasant Hill, California. It is a member church of the Episcopal Diocese of California.  It was formed as an Episcopal mission on July 1, 1959 and the vicar was the Reverend Richard Shackell.  Church of the Resurrection became a parish on March 16, 1967.

Because there was no church building, the congregation met at the Pleasant Hill Bowling Alley and later met at the Seventh Day Adventist Church in Pleasant Hill during the construction of Resurrection’s church building.  Many members of the congregation volunteered in the building of the new church.  The first church services in the new building were held on March 3, 1962.  This was a service of Holy Communion for those who were working on the church.  The church building was officially dedicated on April 29, 1962, by Right Reverend James A. Pike, Bishop of the Episcopal Diocese of California.

Church Buildings

The church building was designed by the  Ratcliff Architects, the oldest architectural firm in the San Francisco Bay Area. The design of the Church of the Resurrection building is noted for the bell-curve vault of its wood-paneled sanctuary. The Ratcliff Architect's plans intended that the new redwood building, with curved arches, would serve eventually as the Parish Hall, and a second building with a high spired roof would serve as the church. Instead, the second building, completed in 2004, is the Parish Hall, and the original building has been reconfigured as the church.

In 2009, Church of the Resurrection celebrated its fiftieth anniversary.  From its beginning, Church of the Resurrection has had only three rectors: the Reverend Richard Shackell (vicar 1959 – 1967, rector 1967 – 1976), the Reverend Ronald Atwood (1977 – 1984), and the Reverend Bruce Smith (1987 – present).  During the period between 1984 and 1987, four interim priests served Resurrection: the Reverend Robert Howell, the Reverend John Archer, the Reverend George Foxworthy, and the Reverend Fran Toy.

Rectors
The Reverend Richard Shackell - He earned a B.A. from Macalester College in St. Paul, Minnesota, in 1949 and he received his master's degree from the Berkeley Divinity School at Yale in 1952.  He was ordained a deacon in June 1952 and a priest on January 1, 1953. Before he became the vicar and later the first rector of Resurrection, the Reverend Richard Shackell served first as the rector of Holy Trinity Church, Willows (1953-1956)and then rector of St. Francis of Assisi Church, Novato (1956-59. He also conducted the first services for a house church that later became Church of the Nativity in San Rafael (Marin County).  Shackell was among the California clergy who answered the call of Dr. Martin Luther King to join in the Civil Rights march from Selma to Birmingham. He led the contingent from the Diocese of California, and was a marshall on the march. The Shackells moved to the Diocese of Los Angeles in 1976 where Richard Shackell served as rector of Grace Church until his retirement in 1984.

The Reverend Ronald Atwood - The Reverend Ronald Atwood came to Resurrection on January 16, 1977.  He had been serving as a priest in three small congregations around Coquille in the southwestern part of Oregon. He received his master's degree from Nashotah House.  During the seven years he served as Resurrection's rector, he brought a high church emphasis to its liturgy.

The Reverend Bruce Smith - Bruce graduated from the University of California in Berkeley in 1972 with a BA degree and he received his master's degree from the Pacific School of Religion in Berkeley.  He was ordained a deacon on June 28, 1980 and a priest on July 1, 1981.  The bishop of the Diocese of California, the Right Reverend William Swing, presided at both ordinations.  Bruce began his ministry in 1980 as a curate of St. Andrew’s Episcopal Church in State College, Pennsylvania, while his wife studied for her master's degree in nutrition from Penn State University.  In 1982, the Smiths returned to the Bay Area, and Bruce became the assistant rector of St. Stephen’s Episcopal Church in Orinda. On March 1, 1987, Bruce preached his first sermon as its rector. Bruce has served as the chair of the Department of Campus Ministry since 1994 and he recently completed a four-year term as a member of the Standing Committee of the Diocese of California.

External links 
 
 Episcopal Diocese of California

Episcopal church buildings in California
Churches in Contra Costa County, California
Organizations based in Contra Costa County, California